Born to Kill (released in the U.K. as Lady of Deceit and in Australia as Deadlier Than the Male) is a 1947 American film noir co-starring Lawrence Tierney, Claire Trevor and Walter Slezak, with Esther Howard, Elisha Cook Jr., and Audrey Long in supporting roles. Directed by Robert Wise for RKO Pictures, the feature was the first film noir production by Wise, whose later films in the genre include The Set-Up (1949) and The Captive City (1952).

Plot
San Francisco socialite Helen Brent has established residence in Reno, Nevada in order to get a divorce decree and is lodging in a boarding house, owned by the feisty Mrs. Kraft. Helen meets Laury Palmer, a fellow boarder and Mrs. Kraft's best friend, who confides that she is going on a date with Danny, to incite jealousy in her new beau, Sam Wilde.

Sam sees them together that evening. Later, he enters Mrs. Kraft's house, and confronts Danny. Sam bludgeons him to death, and then kills Laury, because she was a witness.

Helen discovers the bodies and flees to San Francisco, but does not contact the police. Sam also leaves for San Francisco that night; they meet each other at the train station and begin to travel together. Helen is attracted to his self-assurance. Neither knows the other's part in the events. Back in Reno, Mrs. Kraft hires a private detective, Albert Arnett, to find Laury's killer.

Several days later, Sam arrives unexpectedly at the mansion where Helen is living. It is owned by Georgia Staples, Helen's wealthy foster sister and the heir to her father's newspaper. Georgia finds Sam attractive. Sam tells Marty Waterman, his long-time roommate and enabler, that he is going to marry Georgia for her newspaper money and the opportunity for higher social standing. Helen is distraught at their wedding.

Sam and Helen spar. Helen contradicts herself, telling Sam she loves her sister but she hates her for her money, then Sam kisses her. Martin has traveled to San Francisco for the wedding, and detective Arnett has tailed him there. After he interrogates the staff, Helen artfully reveals information about Sam's activities.

Georgia and Sam fight over Sam's demand to run the newspaper, since she knows he has no experience of the business. However, he is cockily sure he will be a success and wants to run the paper so he can "be on top," so that he can make and break people. He says Helen understands this because "your roots are down here were mine are," and that they are soulmates.

Regarding Georgia, Sam says she means no more to him than Fred Grover (her wealthy fiancé) does to her. Helen replies that without Fred, she is afraid of what she might become. Fred represents good and safety, while Sam represents strength and excitement and depravity. She is not alienated by these characteristics, in fact she becomes excited upon recalling the gruesome death scene back in Reno, and they passionately kiss.

Sam overhears a call to Helen from Reno, which leads him to believe she is against him. Helen meets with Arnett, and she bribes him to ignore Sam's role in the Reno murders.  Her motives are confused: she willfully provided information about Sam to Arnett, but now she wants to protect him.

Mrs. Kraft travels to San Francisco to meet with Arnett, so Martin meets with her also. Martin leads her to the dunes on the outskirts of town, and while Martin prepares to stab her, Sam shows up and kills him out of jealousy (he had seen Martin coming out of Helen's room, and doesn't believe Marty's truthful claim that he was there acting solely in Sam's interest).

The police interrogate the household about Martin's murder, and Helen reluctantly provides an alibi for Sam. Helen meets with Mrs. Kraft, who now knows that Sam killed Laury, and threatens her with a slow and painful death if she goes to the police.

Fred breaks up with Helen, and she panics. He feels that she doesn't have a heart anymore. She admits she's partially an "iceberg of a woman" and rotten as described, but that Fred can help her, that without him she "doesn't stand a chance."

When Helen declines to pay Arnett, he points out that the police will soon arrive for Sam, but she says it can't be too soon to get him out of the house. Helen reveals Sam's murders to Georgia, but she can't believe it. She realizes Helen didn't turn Sam in until she had lost Fred's money. Georgia cuts off Helen permanently.

To demonstrate that Sam doesn't really love Georgia, Helen embraces Sam, making it clear they have a relationship, while Georgia is hidden from Sam's view, so Georgia throws them both out. Helen points out to Sam that Georgia must be eliminated for them to be happy. The police arrive, and Georgia reveals that it was Helen who called them, so Sam shoots Helen, then the police kill Sam.  Helen ultimately dies.

Cast
 
 Claire Trevor as Helen Brent
 Lawrence Tierney as Sam Wilde
 Walter Slezak as Albert Arnett
 Phillip Terry as Fred Grover
 Audrey Long as Georgia Staples
 Elisha Cook Jr. as Marty Waterman
 Isabel Jewell as Laury Palmer
 Esther Howard as Mrs. Kraft
 Tony Barrett as Danny

Production
Pre-production on the film began in early February 1945, more than two years before its release. Thalia Bell of Motion Picture Daily and Irving Spear for Boxoffice reported then that RKO had hired author Steve Fisher to begin writing the screenplay for James Gunn's 1943 novel Deadlier Than the Male. By April, however, the studio had replaced Fisher and enlisted freelance screenwriter Eve Greene and later Richard Macaulay to compose the script as a team and to manage its editing through production.

Cast selections began in August 1945 with Lawrence Tierney being RKO's first choice due to his rising popularity after his powerful performance in Monogram Pictures' Dillinger, which had been released four months earlier. After announcing the casting of Tierney in August, film-industry publications in September and October reported that Tallulah Bankhead was RKO's top pick for the role of Helen Brent, but the actress was unavailable. According to the Film Bulletin the "timing was bad for Miss Bankhead" to join the project, so the part went to Claire Trevor, whose work the previous year in RKO's Murder, My Sweet had impressed studio executives. Trevor in January 1946 signed the contract to co-star in the "psychological mystery" Deadlier Than the Male, which continued to be the working title for the production, as well as the title used later in the year in a series of official release charts. RKO would not officially change the title to Born to Kill for domestic release until December 1946.

Regular news notices document that filming of the production began on May 6, 1946, with exterior scenes being shot first on location at El Segundo Beach, situated about 25 miles southwest of Hollywood.  Additional location work was done in San Francisco as filming continued into the latter half of June. As early as July, it was reported that the film was ready to be scheduled for release. Those notices proved to be premature, for problems evidently arose generating a satisfactory final cut of the film. These persisted into October 1946, when RKO announced that scheduled November 7 previews of "Deadlier Than the Male" at a national trade show and at exchange centers were being postponed. In updating the status of the film, the Hollywood news journal Box Office Digest revealed that the picture was still being edited in October and was on a list of productions identified to be on RKO's "Back Log In Cutting Room". A general release date of November 10, 1946 published earlier for the film was postponed as well.

Post-production problems persisted right up to the final weeks prior to the film's distribution to theaters.

Complicated femme fatale
The picture is a rare film noir in that it is shown through a woman's eyes. This female subjectivity enables a more nuanced view of the femme fatale, a central motif in film noir, rather than what is usually shown. For example, the archetypical femme fatale's sexuality is merely a tool used to manipulate men for material gain. But in this film, Helen is a more complicated figure. She is drawn to Sam's brutality, although she is also interested in Fred's money. Instead of leading the male protagonist into darkness and ruin, it is she who is compromised by Sam. Moreover, her transgressions are a cause of anxiety for her. Her atypical concern over her dark turn results in contradictory behavior, like turning Sam, her lover, over to the police.

Reception in 1947

At the time of its release in 1947, RKO's production was panned by Bosley Crowther, film critic for The New York Times, who called it "a smeary tabloid fable" and "an hour and a half of ostentatious vice." His review concluded: "Surely, discriminating people are not likely to be attracted to this film. But it is precisely because it is designed to pander to the lower levels of taste that it is reprehensible." Cecelia Ager of PM, another New York newspaper, was equally blunt in expressing her utter contempt. Portions of her assessment are quoted in the May 26, 1947 issue of the Independent Exhibitors Bulletin:

Irving Kaplan, the reviewer for the trade journal Motion Picture Daily, found "weaknesses in several departments" of "the heavy-handed melodrama", although his appraisal of the film was far less severe. Kaplan focused his attention on the performances of the "tough and ruthless" Tierney and the "captivating and calculating" Trevor:

After previewing the picture two weeks prior to its release, the trade paper The Film Daily cautioned theater owners about the "homicidal drama", describing it as "a sexy, suggestive yarn of crime with punishment, strictly for the adult trade." Other reviewers in 1947 also recognized the "yarn" as adult fare, but some still commended various elements of the film. William R. Weaver, the critic for the Motion Picture Herald, watched a final cut of Born to Kill in mid-April at RKO and rated it "Good". He found the film's overall look "painstaking and polished" and Robert Wise's direction successful in maintaining "a steady pace". Weaver did, though, find fault with what he viewed as a distinct imbalance between the motives and actions portrayed in the story. "Produced for melodrama fans," he noted, "[the film] contains enough killing for anybody, but furnishes less than adequate reasons for it."

Adverse publicity and efforts to ban the film
In the weeks before and after the film's release, RKO faced two significant public-relations problems in promoting and distributing Born to Kill: widespread news coverage of the ongoing turmoil in Lawrence Tierney's personal life and actions by some state and local authorities to ban the film's presentation within their jurisdictions.

On May 2, 1947—the day before the film's official release—newspapers across the country were reporting yet another arrest of Tierney for his involvement in a "drunken brawl" and for violating probation on an earlier conviction for public drunkenness. Other newspapers as far from Hollywood as Baltimore, Hartford, Atlanta, and Austin picked up the story, one adding that the actor had already been spending his weekends in a Los Angeles jail as punishment for three earlier convictions for public intoxication.

Tierney's frequent off-screen troubles with law enforcement also attracted greater scrutiny of his screen projects by state film-review boards and local censors, who began advocating banning Born to Kill in their communities.

Among other publications, The Film Daily in its April 8 issue reports that Ohio's board of censors had rejected the film and banned it from state theaters. The same news item added that Chicago's police censor board had "declined to pass" the motion picture. The trade paper then reported in subsequent issues that censors in Tennessee had "cracked down" on films they deemed unacceptable and had also banned all presentations of Born to Kill in theaters in Memphis or anywhere else in Shelby County. Then, in mid-May, The Motion Picture Herald disclosed that the National Legion of Decency had not condemned the film outright for its depictions of violence, although the Catholic organization had rated it "Class-B" or "objectionable in part, because it 'reflects the acceptability of divorce.'"

Box office and the film's effect on future RKO productions
In the weeks leading up to the film's release, some industry publications predicted that the crime drama would be "a strong draw at the box-office". The controversies surrounding Born to Kill, however, forced Dore Schary, RKO's executive vice-president in charge of production, to distance the company publicly from the film just days after its release. Schary in assorted interviews with reporters in early May insisted, "As a result of unfavorable reaction to 'Born to Kill', RKO will cut down on the arbitrary use of violence in its films." The Hollywood executive at a motion-picture conference in New York City on May 5 was even more emphatic in his statements about production changes, vowing that "gangster pictures" such as "'Born to Kill' will no longer be produced by RKO Radio".  RKO ended up reporting a net loss of $243,000 on the production after the film's run.

Barred from re-release by MPAA
Negative reviews and unfavorable public reactions to Born to Kill and to another 1947 release, Shoot to Kill, prompted the Motion Picture Association of America (MPAA) before the end of the year to revise its Production Code to strengthen restrictions relating to the content of crime-related films. Additions were also made to the Code's guidelines under Section XI for judging and rejecting unacceptable titles given to studio productions. Following a meeting of its board of directors in New York City on December 3, 1947, the MPA announced to the press that its members had voted unanimously to bar 14 "'objectionable and unsuitable'" films released between 1928 and 1947 from ever being reissued to theaters, including Born to Kill. The association also approved the immediate deletion from its official title registry more than two dozen films with names deemed "salacious or indecent". The day after the New York meeting, the Los Angeles Times summarized the board's decisions in a front-page story headlined "Film Heads Vote Ban On Gangster Pictures" and reported that the American film industry was ceasing the "distribution of new and old pictures glorifying gangster names or criminal practices".

Film showcased in murder trial, 1948
Although Born to Kill faced multiple problems in 1947 with regard to its reception and distribution, RKO's production had to cope with even worse publicity in 1948, most notably with news coverage of the film's alleged connections to a homicide in Illinois. The case involved 12-year-old Howard Lang, who was charged with using a switchblade and a heavy "chunk of concrete" to kill a seven-year-old boy in Thatcher Woods outside Chicago in October 1947. At the time, Lang was the youngest person ever to be arrested and formally tried for murder in that city. The boy's initial trial, which drew widespread media attention, occurred in February 1948. Lang was convicted of the crime, and on April 20 he was sentenced to 22 years in the state penitentiary.

As part of Lang's overall defense and during the successful appeal of his conviction, his lawyers informed the court that their client had seen Born to Kill less than three weeks prior to the homicide. The attorneys insisted that the violent, morally destructive aspects of the film "had affected the boy because of his emotional instability", impairing his judgement and fostering in him a form of temporary insanity. They petitioned the presiding judge to view the film himself so he could appreciate the substance of their allegation that the "gangster" film was a contributing factor in the crime. In the media's ongoing updates on the murder case, newspapers reported that allegation in articles with titles such as "Movie Blamed", "'Born to Kill' Movie Cited In Mitigation For Boy Slayer Lang", and "Court Refuses Plea of Lang Attorney To View 'Killer' Movie".

Less than a year after Lang's initial sentencing, the Illinois Supreme Court overturned his conviction on the grounds that the boy was too young to understand his actions. Lang was then acquitted of the murder in a second trial held in Chicago. The end of the case, however, did not erase the additional negative attention that the trial had focused on Born to Kill and on RKO Pictures itself. In acquitting Lang in April 1949, Judge John A. Sbarbaro recommended the enactment of several new laws to help prevent such ghastly crimes by children, two of those recommendations being to restrict the content of comic books and "to censor movies to the extent of holding theater managers liable for exhibiting 'harmful pictures'".

More recent assessments of the film
Some film critics have come to find Born to Kill something of a harmless guilty pleasure. In his 2003 reference work Film Noir Guide: 745 Films of the Classic Era, 1940-1959, Michael Keaney describes Born to Kill as compelling despite its "hard-to-swallow plot". "This one is all Tierney", Keaney states. "He's outstanding as one of the most violently disturbed psychos in all of film noir, giving even Robert Ryan in Crossfire a run for his money."

Reviewing the film in 2006 for Slant Magazine, critic Fernando F. Croce focuses on the production's director rather than on Tierney:

In 2009, writing for Film Monthly, Robert Weston also focused his attention on Wise's directorial work: 

Director Guillermo del Toro has credited Born to Kill as a primary influence on his 2021 film Nightmare Alley, noting that, "a couple of the murders in the movie are shocking, even in 2022."

References

External links
 
 
 
 

1947 films
1947 crime drama films
American black-and-white films
American crime drama films
1940s English-language films
Film noir
Films based on American novels
Films directed by Robert Wise
Films scored by Paul Sawtell
Films set in Reno, Nevada
Films set in San Francisco
Films shot in Nevada
Films shot in San Francisco
RKO Pictures films
1940s American films